Presidential elections were  held in France  on 23 April, with a second round on 7 May.

Background
The Socialist incumbent president François Mitterrand, who had been in office since 1981, did not stand for a third term. He was 78, had terminal cancer, and his party had lost the 1993 French legislative election in a landslide defeat. Since then, he had been "cohabiting" with a right-wing cabinet led by Prime Minister Edouard Balladur, a member of the neo-Gaullist RPR party. Balladur had promised the RPR leader, Jacques Chirac, that he would not run for the presidency, but as polls showed him doing well and he had the support of many right-wing politicians, he decided to run. The competition within the right between Balladur and Chirac was a major feature of the campaign.

Meanwhile, the left was weakened by scandals and disappointments regarding Mitterrand's presidency along with the unemployment rate hovering around 10%. In June 1994, former Prime Minister Michel Rocard was dismissed as leader of the Socialist Party (PS) after the party's poor showing in the European Parliament elections. Then, Jacques Delors decided not to stand as a candidate because he disagreed with the re-alignment on the left orchestrated by new party leader Henri Emmanuelli. This left the field wide open for numerous potential candidacies: among those who are known to have considered a run, or were strongly urged by others, are Jack Lang, Pierre Joxe, Laurent Fabius, Ségolène Royal and Robert Badinter. Former party leader and education minister Lionel Jospin was chosen by PS members as the party's candidate in a primary election pitting him against Emmanuelli. He promised to restore the credibility and moral reputation of his party, but his chances of winning were seen as being thin. The economy was also still struggling with a depression which began in mid-1990, and the government's policies were widely blamed for both the recession and its slow recovery.

The French Communist Party (PCF) tried to stop its electoral decline. Its new leader Robert Hue campaigned against "king money" and wanted to represent a renewed communism. He was faced with competition for the far left vote by the Trotskyist candidacy of Arlette Laguiller, who ran for the fourth time. Both of these candidates had a better result than their parties had in 1988, but came nowhere near being able to participate in the next round. In choosing Dominique Voynet, the Greens opted for their integration with the left.

On the far-right, Jean-Marie Le Pen tried to repeat his surprising result that he obtained in the 1988 presidential election. His main rival for the far-right vote was Philippe de Villiers, candidate of the eurosceptic parliamentary right. Both candidates primarily focused over the financial situation.

In January 1995, when he announced his candidacy, Balladur was the favourite of the political right. According to the SOFRES polls institute, he held an advantage of 14 points over Chirac (32% against 18% for the first round). He took advantage of his "positive assessment" as Prime Minister and advocated a moderately liberal economic policy. Chirac denounced the "social fracture" and criticised the "dominant thought", targeting Balladur. Chirac argued that "the pay slip is not the enemy of employment". Indeed, unemployment was the main theme of the campaign. From the start of March, Chirac gained ground on Balladur in the polls.  
Another factor that contributed to Balladur's fall in popularity was the revelation of a bugging scandal which had implicated Balladur.<ref>Opinion poll shows Balladur in big trouble New Straits Times, 22 February 1995. At Google News</ref>

Chirac's campaign slogan was "La France pour tous" ("France for everyone"); Balladur's "Believe in France"; and Jospin's "A clear vote for a more just France".

Opinion polls
 First round 

Results

First round
Lionel Jospin won the first round, in what appeared to be an electoral recovery for the Socialist Party. His right-wing challenger for the runoff vote on 7 May was Jacques Chirac and not Edouard Balladur. Defeated, Balladur endorsed the RPR candidate. Jean-Marie Le Pen repeated his good result of the previous presidential election.

By department

By region

Second round
During the TV debate between the two finalists, they disagreed about the presidential term. Jospin wanted to reduce it to five years whereas Chirac was in favour of the seven-year term. The PS candidate responded: "The choice is five years with me or seven years with Jacques Chirac, which will be very long". Eventually, the presidential term was reduced to five years after the 2002 election.

Chirac was elected President and Balladur resigned as prime minister. Foreign minister Alain Juppé succeeded him.

By department

By region

See also
Angolagate

References

 Further reading
 Cole, Alistair. "La France pour tous?—The French Presidential Elections of 23 April and 7 May 1995." Government and Opposition 30.3 (1995): 327–346. online
 Dow, Jay K. "Voter choice in the 1995 French presidential election." Political Behavior 21.4 (1999): 305–324.
 Elgie, Robert, ed. Electing the French President: 1995 Presidential Election (1996)
 Lewis-Beck, Michael S., and Kevin Chlarson. "Party, ideology, institutions and the 1995 French presidential election." British Journal of Political Science 32.3 (2002): 489–512. online
 Maarek, Philippe J. "New trends in French political communication: the 1995 presidential elections." Media, Culture & Society 19.3 (1997): 357–368.
 Schlesinger, Joseph A., and Mildred S. Schlesinger. "Dual-ballot elections and political parties: the French presidential election of 1995." Comparative Political Studies'' 31.1 (1998): 72–97.

External links
 Radio-TV debate Jacques Chirac/Lionel Jospin
 Announcement of the result of the second round, on TV

France
President
Mitterrand–Pasqua affair
Presidential elections in France